Orta San Giulio is a town and comune (municipality) in the Province of Novara in the Italian region of Piedmont, located about  northeast of Turin and about  northwest of Novara.

The town itself is built on a promontory which juts out from the eastern bank of Lake Orta close to Isola San Giulio, an island which also falls within the municipal boundaries. The frazione Legro stands on the hill which rises behind the promontory,  Corconio is some  further south, and again away from the lake, while Imola consists of a small number of dwellings between the two, but close to the lake on the road leading to Gozzano. The municipality borders on Pettenasco to the north, Miasino and Ameno to the east, Bolzano Novarese and Gozzano to the south, and San Maurizio d'Opaglio and Pella to the west across the lake.

It is well known for the nearby Sacro Monte, which is a site of pilgrimage and worship and, like the town itself and the island, is a popular destination for fairly small-scale tourism. In 2003, the Sacro Monte of Orta was inserted by UNESCO in the World Heritage List.

In May 1882, Friedrich Nietzsche and Lou Andreas-Salomé, accompanied by her mother and a mutual friend, visited Orta for a few days on their way back from a Grand Tour of Italy. The couple visited the Sacro Monte for some hours and Nietzsche fell in love with the charming Russian. Salomé could not afterwards remember if she had kissed the philosopher and she was not in love with him, a fact which caused him much anguish.

Villa Crespi
Villa Crespi is a 19th-century Moorish revival-style rural palace located in Orta, and is now a luxury hotel and restaurant managed by chef and restaurateur Antonino Cannavacciuolo. The villa used to be Crespi's family holiday home. Cristoforo Benigno Crespi, the owner who commissioned this wonderful mansion, wanted the villa to remind him of the buildings he saw during his working trips to the Middle East. Therefore this majestic three-floored villa also includes a minaret-looking tower overlooking the lake. 

In 1914 it was the location for the film Iwna, the Ganges' pearl (original title Iwna, la perla del Gange) by Giuseppe Pinto. (Info by the Dizionario del Turismo Cinematografico)

Sacro Monte
The Sacro Monte of Orta is located within a historical park, which now is a nature reserve, of 13 hectares.
It includes: 

 21 votive chapels dating back to the end of the 16th and 17th centuries with frescoes and terracotta sculptures narrating the life of Saint Francis of Assisi;
 370 real dimension polychrome statues of terracotta realized by the best artists of the Lombard school, who also worked on Milan's Duomo;
 over 900 frescoes creating real theatrical representations.

The devotional path ends with the Church of Saint Francis and Nicolao, a proto-Romanic building that was then remodelled in the 17th century so that it would resemble the Lower Basilica of Assisi.

Sacro Monte of Orta was inspired by the nearby Sacro Monte of Varallo, which dates back to the end of the 15th century.

References

External links

 Official website
 Official website for Sacro Monte
 Official website Isola San Giulio
 3 spherical panoramas of Orta San Giulio
 WEBCAM Orta San Giulio live
 News and Events on Orta Lake

 
Car-free zones in Europe
Populated places on Lake Orta